Sluffing has multiple meanings:

 Loose snow avalanche, non cohesive snow falling down a slope.
 Truancy, absence from schooling.
 Sluffing (cards), playing cards of little or no value in a card game.